
Witham on the Hill is a village and civil parish in the South Kesteven district of Lincolnshire, England. The population of the civil parish was 260 at the 2011 census.

History

The hall is a Grade II listed building, dating from ca 1730 but extended several times. The hall  was once owned by descendants of Archdeacon Robert Johnson, the founder of Oakham and Uppingham Schools, including Lieutenant-General William Augustus Johnson MP.

The parish church is dedicated to Saint Andrew. The tower and steeple were re-built in a medieval revival style by the Stamford architect George Portwood in 1737–8.

The original village stocks and whipping post are preserved under a modern canopy.

In 2002, West Farm (on the Little Bytham road) had trials for GM rapeseed planted by Aventis.

Geography
To the west is Little Bytham, and to the east are Manthorpe and Toft. The predominant landowner in the area is the Grimsthorpe Estate.

The civil parish covers a large area, extending north into Grimsthorpe Park and Dobbins Wood where it meets the boundary of Edenham, and the boundary with Toft with Lound and Manthorpe is mostly along the A6121. Manthorpe, Bourne used to be part of the civil parish.

Community

The village has a  co-educational preparatory school, Witham Hall, which marked its 50th year in 2009. The nearest state primary school is on Creeton Road in Little Bytham. Secondary schools are in Bourne.

The Six Bells public house was built in 1905 by the architect A. N. Prentice and is Grade II listed. It is on the road to the A6121. When built, the parish church did have six bells, but in 1932 they were augmented to eight.

References

External links

 St Andrew's Church, Witham on the Hill - Church Website
 Bourne Online's Witham page
 Parliamentary Gazetteer entry 1843
 Witham Hall school web site

Villages in Lincolnshire
Civil parishes in Lincolnshire
South Kesteven District